Martin Nicholas Pavelich (born November 6, 1927) is a Canadian former ice hockey left winger. He played ten seasons for the Detroit Red Wings of the National Hockey League from 1947 until 1957. Pavelich is the last surviving member of the Red Wings 1950 Stanley Cup team.

Early career
Pavelich played three seasons (1944–47) of junior-league hockey with the Ontario Hockey Association (OHA) Galt Red Wings in Galt, Ontario. He played 74 regular season games for the team, scoring 52 goals, with 66 assists for a total of 118 points.

NHL career
Pavelich joined the NHL Detroit Red Wings in 1947. He played a total of 634 regular season NHL games, scoring 93 goals and 159 assists for 252 points. His post-season record is 13 goals, 15 assists for 28 points in 93 games. The Red Wings won the Stanley Cup four times (1950, 1952, 1954, 1955) during his career and he played in the NHL all-star games for those seasons.

Pavelich is regarded as an unsung hero of the early 1950s powerhouse Red Wing squad that also included Gordie Howe and Ted Lindsay. Wings manager, Jack Adams, referred to Pavelich as "one of the four key men around whom we build our hockey club." Hockey journalist Stan Fischler, ranked him as the 4th best defensive forward of all time in his book Hockey's 100: A Personal Ranking of the Best Players in Hockey History.  Considered one of the best "shadows" of his time, his role was to check other team's top scorers, including the likes of Maurice "Rocket" Richard.

Post-NHL
Pavelich left the Red Wings at the end of the 1956-57 season. He and Ted Lindsay ran a successful plastics manufacturing business together that supplied parts to the automotive industry. He rejected a 1958 contract which called for a minor-league option. "I told him I could get him a $7,000 base salary in the minors, which is a good contract, but Marty said he'd retire first," Detroit General Manager Jack Adams said. Pavelich retired after the 1956-57 season, rather than risk being moved away from the Wings and his business.

Career statistics

References

1927 births
Living people
Canadian ice hockey left wingers
Canadian people of Croatian descent
Detroit Red Wings players
Sportspeople from Sault Ste. Marie, Ontario
Stanley Cup champions
Ice hockey people from Ontario
World Hockey Association broadcasters